Khunjerab Railway, also known as China–Pakistan railway, is one of several proposed railway lines in Pakistan, to be operated and maintained by Pakistan Railways. The current active line begins from Taxila Junction station and ends at Havelian station. A proposed extension will see new track laid from Havelian station to the Pakistan-China border at the Khunjerab Pass where it will link up with China's Kashgar–Hotan railway.

History 

In 2007, consultants were engaged to investigate the construction of a railway through the Khunjerab Pass in Gilgit-Baltistan to connect China Railway with Pakistan Railways. A feasibility study started in November 2009 for a line connecting Havelian and Kashgar. 750 km (466 mi) of the line would extend through Pakistan, while the remaining 350 km (217 mi) in China. In June 2014, China commissioned a "preliminary research study" to build an international rail link to Pakistan. In 2016 this 682 km proposed railway link was reported to be part of the China–Pakistan Economic Corridor, and was to commence construction during the second phase of CPEC between 2018-2022. However the construction of this railway line was not mentioned in the CPEC Long Term Plan from 2017-2030 released jointly by China and Pakistan in 2017. China's involvement in several rail projects in Pakistan is motivated primarily by commercial considerations, but it also sees distinct advantages for its improved transportation and access to Central Asia and the Persian Gulf states.

Route
The stations on this line are as follows:

Active Line
 Taxila Cantonment Junction
 Usman Khattar
 Mohra Shah Wali
 Hattar
 Kot Najib Ullah
 Haripur Hazara
 Serai Saleh
 Baldher
 Havelian

Proposed Line 
 Abbottabad
 Mansehra
 Besham
 Dasu
 Chilas
 Gilgit
 Hunza
 Sost
 Khunjerab Junction

Cost
Pakistan awarded a Rs72 million (US$1.2 million) contract to an international consortium to carry out a feasibility study for establishing a rail link with China to boost trade relations between the two countries.

See also
 Karachi–Peshawar Line
 Railway lines in Pakistan

References

5 ft 6 in gauge railways in Pakistan
Transport in Gilgit-Baltistan
Economy of Gilgit-Baltistan
Proposed railway lines in China
Proposed public transport in Pakistan
Mountain railways
Rail transport in China
Rail transport in Pakistan
China–Pakistan relations
China–Pakistan Economic Corridor